Audrius Stonys (born on April 28, 1966 in Vilnius) is a Lithuanian documentary filmmaker. He is recipient of the European Film Award for the documentary film Neregių žemė (Earth of the Blind) in 1992 and the Lithuanian National Prize in 2002. Since 1989 he has created 13 documentaries and one short fiction film. His film Skrydis per Lietuvą arba 510 sekundžių tylos (The Flight over Lithuania or 510 Seconds of Silence) co-created with Arūnas Matelis was well received at the Expo 2000. Stonys is a member of the European Documentary Network and European Film Academy.

His 2011 film Ramin was selected as the Lithuanian entry for the Best Foreign Language Oscar at the 85th Academy Awards, but it did not make the final shortlist.

Awards and nominations

References

Further reading
 Audrius Stonys: Showing the Invisible in: Lithuanian Cinema: Special Edition for Lithuanian Film Days in Poland 2015, Auksė Kancerevičiūtė [ed.]. Vilnius: Lithuanian Film Centre, 2015. .

External links
 

1966 births
Living people
Lithuanian film directors
Lithuanian documentary filmmakers
Film people from Vilnius
Recipients of the Lithuanian National Prize